Otto; or, Up with Dead People is a 2008 Canadian and German queer cinema horror film. The film was directed by Bruce LaBruce and stars Jey Crisfar, Marcel Schlutt, Nicholas Fox Ricciardi and Gio Black Peter.

Plot 
A young gay man named Otto believes that he is a zombie and has hitched a ride to Berlin and begins to explore the city. Otto is discovered by underground filmmaker Medea Yarn, who begins to make a documentary about him with the support of her girlfriend, Hella Bent, and her brother Adolf. Medea is trying to finish Up with Dead People, the epic political-porno-zombie movie that she has been working on and convinces its star, Fritz Fritze, to allow the vulnerable Otto to stay in his guest bedroom. Otto discovers that he has a wallet that contains information about his past life, remembering details about his ex-boyfriend, Rudolf. He arranges to meet him at the schoolyard where they met. It becomes clear that Otto is human, but dealing with schizophrenia- the soundtrack and visual background repeatedly feature discontinuous sounds and abrupt flashes of light. As Medea prepares to finish her film with a climactic gay zombie orgy, Otto is queerbashed. He makes his way back to Fritz' flat and the two of them make love. Medea finally ends her project with the fictionalised version of Otto burnt to non-existence. However, offscreen, Otto decides to leave Berlin and is last seen hitch-hiking out of the city.

Cast 
 Jey Crisfar as Otto
 Marcel Schlutt as Fritz Fritze
 Nicholas Fox Ricciardi as Man in Hooded Sweatshirt
 Keith Boehm as Man in a Suit and Hat
 Olivia Barth as Woman in Black Burga
 Christophe Chemin as Maximilian
 Katharina Klewinghaus as Medea Yarn
 Gio Black Peter as Rudolph
 Bürger P.

Soundtrack 
The film's soundtrack (released on CD and as a Limited Double LP on the Crippled Dick Hot Wax label) contains an eclectic selection of pieces by contemporary musicians. Among them: Antony and the Johnsons, CocoRosie, The Homophones, Othon Mataragas and Ernesto Tomasini.

Reception
Critical reception for Otto; or Up with Dead People has been mixed. On Rotten Tomatoes the film has an approval rating of 50% based on 20 reviews, with an average rating of 5.00/10.

Awards
Merlinka festival International Queer Film Festival, Belgrade Serbia - Best Queer Film

References

External links
 
 
 

2008 films
German horror films
2000s German-language films
English-language Canadian films
Pornographic zombie films
Films directed by Bruce LaBruce
Canadian LGBT-related films
Gay-related films
German LGBT-related films
2008 LGBT-related films
LGBT-related horror films
Canadian zombie films
2000s Canadian films
2000s German films